The Atacama Desert is the most arid desert in the world which is located in Chile.

Atacama may refer to:

People 
 Atacama people (Likan Antaí), indigenous people of Chile

Places
 Atacama Region, first-order administrative division of Chile
 Atacama Province, Bolivia, former province of Bolivia
 Atacama Province, Chile, former province of Chile
 Atacama Department, former department of Bolivia, now in Chile

Geological formations
 Atacama Trench, oceanic trench running along the west coast of South-America
 Puna de Atacama, high plateau in the Andes
 Atacama Fault

Other
 Atacama border dispute, territorial dispute between Chile and Bolivia
 Puna de Atacama dispute, territorial dispute between Chile and Argentina
 18725 Atacama, a minor planet